Heusted Warner Reynolds Hoyt (November 1, 1842 – April 8, 1894) was a member of the Connecticut Senate representing the 12th District from 1869 to 1870 and from 1873 to 1874. He was a member of the Connecticut House of Representatives from 1886 to 1889, and he served as Speaker of the Connecticut House of Representatives from 1887 to 1889.

Early life and family 
Hoyt was born in Ridgefield, Connecticut on November 1, 1842. He was the son of the Rev. Warner Hoyt, the rector of St. Stephen's Episcopal Church, and Elizabeth Phillipina Reynolds. His father died when Heusted was three years old.

Political career 
He was elected a member of the Connecticut Senate in 1869 and in 1873.

He was elected a member of the Connecticut House of Representatives from 1886 to 1889, and he served as Speaker of the Connecticut House of Representatives from 1887 to 1889.

He was elected the first judge of the Borough Court of Greenwich in 1889, and held that office as long as he lived.

References

1842 births
1894 deaths
Columbia College (New York) alumni
Connecticut lawyers
Republican Party members of the Connecticut House of Representatives
Republican Party Connecticut state senators
Municipal judges in the United States
People from Ridgefield, Connecticut
People from Greenwich, Connecticut
Speakers of the Connecticut House of Representatives
19th-century American politicians
19th-century American judges
19th-century American lawyers